Aranca may refer to:
 Aranca, a river in the Banat region of Romania and Serbia
 Two 19th century Pima Villages:
 Arenal, Arizona (Aranca No. 1)
 Aranca No. 2